Philharmonia eurysia is a moth in the family Lecithoceridae. It was described by Chun-Sheng Wu in 2000. It is found on Borneo.

References

Moths described in 2000
Philharmonia